Pam Buckway (born June 15, 1949) is a Canadian former politician. She represented the electoral district of Lake Laberge in the Yukon Legislative Assembly as a member of the Yukon Liberal Party.

Buckway first won the seat in a by-election in 1999, following the resignation of Doug Livingston from the legislature. She retained the seat in the 2000 election, and served as Minister of Community and Transportation Services in the government of Pat Duncan, but was defeated by Brad Cathers of the Yukon Party in the 2002 election.

Prior to entering elected politics, Buckway was an announcer for CFWH, the CBC North station in the Yukon.

References

1949 births
Living people
CBC Radio hosts
Politicians from Whitehorse
Women MLAs in Yukon
Yukon Liberal Party MLAs
Canadian women radio hosts